Robert King Beathard Jr. (January 24, 1937 – January 30, 2023) was an American professional football executive who was a general manager for the Washington Redskins and San Diego Chargers of the National Football League (NFL). Over the course of his 38 years in the NFL, his teams competed in seven Super Bowls (winning four), beginning with the Kansas City Chiefs in 1966, the Miami Dolphins in 1972 and 1973, the Redskins in 1982, 1983, and 1987, and the Chargers in 1994. He was inducted into the Pro Football Hall of Fame in 2018.

Early life and playing career
Beathard was born in Zanesville, Ohio, before moving to El Segundo, California, at the age of four. He attended El Segundo High School but did not begin playing football until his sophomore year, as a tailback. In college, he accepted a scholarship to play football for LSU, but returned home after summer practices after feeling homesick. He then enrolled at El Camino Junior College for a year before enrolling at Cal Poly, where he played football as a back-up running back and later the starting quarterback and defensive back, leading Cal Poly to back-to-back 9–1 seasons. He went undrafted in 1959 and had pre-season stints with two professional teams, but was unable to find a spot, spending his early post-college years playing semi-pro football and working various non-football jobs.

Executive career

Scout
Beathard joined the Kansas City Chiefs as a part-time scout in 1963. He left the Chiefs for the American Football League before returning to Kansas City in 1966. Beathard then served as a scout for the Atlanta Falcons from 1968 through 1971. He was named director of player personnel for the Miami Dolphins in 1972, succeeding Joe Thomas. From 1972 to 1973, the Dolphins would go 26-2 with two Super Bowls victories, including a perfect season in 1972.

General manager
Beathard was named general manager of the Washington Redskins in 1978. Prominent draft picks for the Redskins under his tenure include Art Monk, Mark May, Russ Grimm, Dexter Manley, Charlie Brown, Darrell Green, Charles Mann, and Gary Clark. Beathard resigned from the team prior to the 1989 NFL Draft and spent that year as a studio analyst with NFL on NBC. In 1990, Beathard became the general manager of the San Diego Chargers. In 1994, the organization won the AFC Championship and appeared in its first Super Bowl. He retired in 2000.

Personal life
Beathard resided with his wife Christine in Franklin, Tennessee. Beathard's younger brother, Pete Beathard, was a quarterback at USC, the Kansas City Chiefs and the Houston Oilers. One of Beathard's sons, Casey Beathard, is a country music songwriter. His other son, Kurt Beathard, is a football coach, formerly the offensive coordinator for Illinois State.  His grandson, Jeffery "Bobo" Beathard, played four years at Appalachian State University as a wide receiver; while other grandsons, C. J. Beathard and Tucker Beathard, are a quarterback and a singer-songwriter respectively. Another of Beathard's grandsons, Clayton Beathard, was fatally stabbed in a bar fight in Nashville, Tennessee, in 2019.

Beathard participated in the 1984 New York City Marathon. From 2005 to 2009, Beathard was a consecutive 5 time first place winner in the men's age 65 and over group at the World Bodysurfing Championships held annually in Oceanside, California. Beathard was inducted into the Cal Poly Mustangs Athletics Hall of Fame in 1988. He was inducted into the Pro Football Hall of Fame and Chargers Hall of Fame in 2018. 

Beathard died from Alzheimer's disease at his home in Franklin, Tennessee, on January 30, 2023, at the age of 86.

References

1937 births
2023 deaths
Atlanta Falcons scouts
American football defensive backs
American football quarterbacks
American football running backs
Cal Poly Mustangs football players
Kansas City Chiefs scouts
Miami Dolphins executives
National Football League general managers
San Diego Chargers executives
Washington Redskins executives
Pro Football Hall of Fame inductees
El Segundo High School alumni
People from Encinitas, California
Sportspeople from San Diego County, California
Sportspeople from Zanesville, Ohio
Players of American football from California
Players of American football from Ohio
Deaths from Alzheimer's disease
Deaths from dementia in Tennessee